DW may refer to:

News media 
 Deutsche Welle, a Germany-based, international news publisher
 DW News
 DW-TV
 DW (Español)
 Duowei News, or "DW News", an American Chinese-language news website
 The Daily Wire, an American conservative news website

Businesses and organizations
 Daniel Wellington, a Swedish watch company
 Development Workshop, a non-profit organization
 Drum Workshop, or "DW Drums", an American drum kit and hardware manufacturer
 DW Sports Fitness, a defunct British sports and fitness retailer
 Dollywood, a theme park in Tennessee, United States

Art and entertainment

Film and television
 Darkwing Duck, a cartoon character
 Deadliest Warrior, an American factual television program
 Doctor Who, a British science fiction television programme
 Dora Winifred Read (D.W.), a character in the Arthur TV show and book series
 DreamWorks SKG, an American movie studio

Other media
 Discworld, a series of books by Terry Pratchett
 Digimon World, a video game
 Dynasty Warriors, a hack and slash video game series

People
 Darrell Waltrip (born 1947), American race car driver
 Don West (educator) (1906–1992), American educator
 Don West (sportscaster) (born 1963), American sportscaster
 Dwyane Wade (born 1982), American professional basketball player

Software
 Data warehouse, a software reporting provision
 Adobe Dreamweaver, a software application for Web development
 DirectWrite, a text layout and glyph rendering API

Other uses
 Deadweight tonnage, a ship measurement for capacity
 Dry weight, a weight measurement excluding water weight
 DW Stadium, a stadium in England
 Devizes to Westminster International Canoe Race, a canoe race in England
 Double-wide, a large mobile home
 Durbin–Watson statistic, a test statistic
 Dust wrapper, an outer cover for books